Elections for the members of the House of Representatives were held on June 3, 1919 pursuant to the Philippine Organic Act of 1902, which prescribed elections for every three years. The ruling Nacionalista Party increased its majority from 75 seats out of 90 seats in the 1916 election to 83 out of 90 seats in this election.

Results

Note

A.  On April 22, 1917, the Progresista and the Democrata Nacional merged to form the Democrata Party. This led to the combination of their seats which totaled to 9 seats.

References

  

1919
History of the Philippines (1898–1946)
1919 elections in Asia
1919 in the Philippines